The conquest of Oran by the Spanish Empire took place on May 1509, when an army led by Pedro Navarro on behalf of the Cardinal Cisneros seized the North African city, which was controlled by the Kingdom of Tlemcen.

Background 
The Spanish captured the city of Mers-El-Kébir after a successful expedition against the local Algerian dynasty, the Zayyanids. In 1507, the Zayyanids ambushed the city of Mers-el-Kébir, with about 11,000 cavalry, gaining a decisive victory against  the Spanish forces.

The siege 
Preparations for the expedition began in September 1508. The Crown invested 39.6 million maravedis in the expedition. In comparison, the armada to Castilla del Oro in 1514 would cost 14 million and the armada of Maluco led by Hernando de Magallanes cost 8.35 million.

A fleet left port from Cartagena on 16 May and sailed towards Mers el-Kebir, a city located near Oran and already (since 1505) under Spanish control. The fleet had 80 naos and 10 galleys, plus additional small boats. They carried around 8000-12,000 infantry-men and 3000-4000 cavalry-men. The army spent the night of 17 May in Mers el Kebir.
The Christians stormed the city of Oran, then part of the Kingdom of Tlemcen, combining the use of the fleet with a ground assault on 18 May. After breaking through the walls of the city the casualties numbered less than 30 on the assaulting side, while the 12,000 defenders suffered 4,000 casualties.

On 20 May, Cisneros entered the city, already conquered.

The city remained a part of the Spanish Empire until 1708, when it was seized by the Ottoman Dey of Algiers taking advantage of the War of the Spanish Succession. The city was conquered again by the Spanish in 1732. After the 1790 Oran earthquake, they abandoned Oran and Mers el-Kebir in 1792.

References

Bibliography 
 
 

Conflicts in 1509
Military history of Spain
Military history of Algeria
Amphibious operations involving Spain